Philodoria lipochaetaella is a moth of the family Gracillariidae. It was first described by Otto Swezey in 1940. It is endemic to the Hawaiian island of Maui.

The larvae feed on Lipochaeta lavarum. They probably mine the leaves of their host plant.

External links

Philodoria
Endemic moths of Hawaii